Hunger for Love is a 1968 Brazilian drama film directed by Nelson Pereira dos Santos. It was entered into the 18th Berlin International Film Festival.

Cast
 Arduíno Colassanti - Felipe
 Leila Diniz - Ulla
 Paulo Porto - Alfredo

References

External links

1968 drama films
1968 films
1960s Portuguese-language films
Brazilian black-and-white films
Brazilian drama films
Films directed by Nelson Pereira dos Santos